Hoshiyar ( Careful) is a 1985 Hindi-language action film, produced by G. Hanumantha Rao under the Padmalaya Studios banner, presented by Krishna and directed by K. Raghavendra Rao. It stars Jeetendra, Shatrughan Sinha, Jaya Prada, Meenakshi Sheshadri and music composed by Bappi Lahiri. The film is a remake of the Telugu movie Kirayi Rowdylu (1981). The film did not do well at the box office.

Plot
Jagannath, Dhartiraj and Malpani are close friends. Jagannath wins a lot of money but the other two kill him out of greed and steal it for themselves, leaving Jagannath's family impoverished. Jagannath's wife Sitadevi leaves the town along with two sons, Rakesh & Rajesh. The train they are traveling on has an accident, causing Rajesh to be separated, and he is adopted by an old man. After some time, he dies and leaves his blind granddaughter Shanti in Rajesh's care.  Finally, the movie ends on a happy note with the marriages of Rakesh & Jyothi and Rajesh & Radha.

Cast
The cast is as follows:
Jeetendra as Rakesh
Shatrughan Sinha as Rajesh
Jaya Prada as Radha
Meenakshi Sheshadri as Jyoti
Tanuja as Seeta
Pran as Dhartiraj
Kader Khan as Malpani
Shakti Kapoor as Malpani's Son
Asrani as Jumbo
Ranjeet as Shambhu Das

Production
The film is one of several collaborations between Jeetendra and Jaya Prada.

Soundtrack
The music of the film was composed by Bappi Lahiri.

Track listing

Reception
The film was listed by India Today as one of the year's expensive Hindi action films which did not leave a mark commercially. Rediff.com lists the film as an example to films employing the exaggerated "dishoom dishoom" sound effect in action scenes.

References

External links

1980s Hindi-language films
Films directed by K. Raghavendra Rao
Films scored by Bappi Lahiri
Hindi remakes of Telugu films